The South Branch Birch River is a  river in Aroostook County, Maine, in the United States. From the outlet of a small pond in Maine Township 16, Range 9, WELS, it runs southeast and east to its confluence with the North Branch in the town of Eagle Lake to form the Birch River. It is part of the Fish River watershed, draining north to the Saint John River, which flows southeast to the Bay of Fundy in New Brunswick, Canada.

See also
List of rivers of Maine

References

Maine Streamflow Data from the USGS
Maine Watershed Data From Environmental Protection Agency

Rivers of Aroostook County, Maine
Tributaries of the Saint John River (Bay of Fundy)
North Maine Woods